Chopticon High School is a public high school located in Morganza, Maryland, United States. The school serves students in grades 9–12. It offers college preparatory programs and programs that prepare students for business and technical occupations. It serves the community in the northern portion of St. Mary's County, Maryland, between the Potomac River and Patuxent River. The area is mainly rural communities, with a recent rise in suburban development. Many of the families are employed by NAS Patuxent River, government contractors, St. Mary's College of Maryland, St Mary's County government, and traditional agriculture and water-related businesses.

Chopticon High School is accredited by the Middle States Association of Colleges and Secondary Schools and the Maryland State Department of Education. Chopticon also offers the Academy of Visual and Performing Arts (AVPA) and the Academy of Finance (AOF). Chopticon High School belongs to the St. Mary's County Public School System (or SMCPS) and is associated with two other county high schools: Great Mills High School and Leonardtown High School.

The high school made news in 2015 when, on May 20, several students broke in at 3:40 am and released 72,000 ladybugs throughout the school. The four students, who were seniors at the school, were charged with 4th degree burglary, property destruction under $1,000 and disruption of school activities.

Chopticon High School was founded in 1965, as a replacement to Margaret Brent High School (founded in 1921 – now Margaret Brent Middle School).

Music
The Chopticon marching band, also known as "The Showband of Southern Maryland," won 7 consecutive USBands Maryland State Championships from 2009 to 2015 and their 8th in 2018. Under the direction of former director Todd Burroughs, the Chopticon marching band also won the USBands 2A National Championships in 2012.

Sports

Chopticon High School Athletics belongs to the Southern Maryland Athletic Conference, and competes in Maryland Division 4A in state competitions. On March 24, 2014 the Chopticon varsity softball team ended the Northern varsity softball team's state record 77-game winning streak by a score of 5–3. The baseball team won the 2015 3A State Championship by defeating Mt. Hebron High School 1–0 in the championship game. The pitcher in that game, LJay Newsome, ended up being drafted by the Seattle Mariners in the 2015 MLB Draft. In 2016, the softball program made their first state championship since 1985, however they lost 7–2 to Sherwood High School.

On June 12, 2017 Chopticon saw another alumnus get selected in the MLB Draft. Former Catcher Robby Kidwell was drafted in the 36th round by the New York Mets.

Notable alumni
Jerome Adams, Class of 1992, 20th Surgeon General of the United States.
James Kilpatrick
Elisa Rae Shupe
Ljay Newsome

References

External links
 Chopticon High School

Educational institutions established in 1965
Public high schools in Maryland
Schools in St. Mary's County, Maryland
1965 establishments in Maryland